The International Linguapax Award is awarded annually on International Mother Language Day (21 February) by Linguapax (Linguapax International) "which recognises and awards the actions carried out in different areas in favour of the preservation of linguistic diversity, revitalization and reactivation of linguistic communities and the promotion of multilingualism". 
Candidates are individuals of the academic community and civil society as well as entities or collectives. Nominations for each year's prize are usually made public on 21 February of each year.

Linguapax Award Winners

The International Linguapax Award was first given in 2002.

External links 
Linguapax (official site)
International Linguapax Award

References

Awards established in 2002
Language-related awards
2002 establishments in Spain